Karaiyamputhur  is a village in Bahour Commune of Bahour taluk  in the Union Territory of Puducherry, India. It is one of the 11 Enclaves of Puducherry. Karaiyamputhur serves as a gateway to Puducherry - Panruti route. It lies on the southwesternmost tip of Puducherry district.

Toponymy
The name Karaiyamputhur means new settlement on the banks of a river. Here the karai (banks) refers to Pennaiyar River banks. Pennaiyatrukaraiputhur may be the name which gets shortened to Karaiyamputhur.The original name may be Karaiyanputrur.

Geography
Karaiyamputhur is surrounded by villages of Tamil Nadu on all side. It is connected to Bahour, its Commune Headquarters by Frontier Road (RC-21).

Villages
Karaiyamputhur village panchayat consist of

 Karaiyamputhur
 Chinna Karaiyamputhur
 Panayadikuppam

Gallery

Politics
Karaiyamputhur is a part of Nettapakkam (Union Territory Assembly constituency) which comes under Puducherry (Lok Sabha constituency)

References

External links
Official website of the Government of the Union Territory of Puducherry

Villages in Puducherry district